Oratorio de Concepción is a municipality in the Cuscatlán department of El Salvador.

Municipalities of the Cuscatlán Department